Hollyoaks is a British television soap opera that has aired on Channel 4 since 23 October 1995. The soap has earned various awards and nominations over the years for its storylines, performances from the ensemble cast and production team.

All About Soap Awards
The All About Soap Awards (formerly The All About Soap Bubble Awards) were presented by All About Soap magazine and voted for by the public. They started in 2002.

British Academy Scotland Awards

British Academy Television Awards
The British Academy Television Awards were launched in 1954 and are presented during an annual award show hosted by the British Academy of Film and Television Arts.

The British Soap Awards
The British Soap Awards is an annual awards ceremony which honours the best of British soap operas. The first event took place in 1999.

Creative Diversity Network Soap Award

Digital Spy Soap Awards
The Digital Spy Soap Awards are hosted by the entertainment website Digital Spy. The first awards were presented in 2008, where Hollyoaks was nominated in 12 of the 14 categories. From 2014, Digital Spy began holding the Digital Spy Reader Awards.

Inside Soap Awards
The Inside Soap Awards are held by Inside Soap magazine every year and voted for by readers.

National Television Awards

Royal Television Society Awards
The Royal Television Society Awards is an annual ceremony hosted by the educational charity Royal Television Society to acknowledge achievements in broadcasting.

Stonewall Awards
The Stonewall Awards were held by the LGBT rights charity Stonewall from 2006 until 2015.

TRIC Awards
The TRIC Awards are presented by the Television and Radio Industries Club.

Writers' Guild of Great Britain Awards
The Writers' Guild of Great Britain Awards is an annual award ceremony ran by the Writers' Guild of Great Britain, celebrating the achievements of screenwriters.

Broadcast Digital Awards

References

External links
 Awards and nominations for Hollyoaks at the Internet Movie Database

Hollyoaks
Lists of awards by television series